, is a Japanese artist, singer-songwriter, voice actress, composer and producer currently based on Japan. Also Ex-CEO for Dog-Rights Co.,Ltd.

Biography 
Born in Hiroshima, Japan to a chorister father and mother who taught electronic organ, Sora started playing the piano at the age of two. She won a grand prix in the Hiroshima regional stage of the  "Yamaha Popular Song Contest" (known as POPCON) when she was four, and went on to win a prize in the national competition. She was a prize winner in the "Yamaha Junior Original Concert" while still at her elementary school, where she discovered her interest in song writing. She is a graduate of Doshisha University.

She released her debut single 'Toushindai no Chikyugi' on February 14, 1998 and has produced various songs since.
She formed DAUGHTER, a duo group with her real sister named marhy. She was a member of Spiral Spiders. The group toured in Japan and the U.S., and performed live concerts at Anime Central in Chicago. She is a well-known singer-songwriter for anime and manga and produces music for 'Binzume Yōsei' (Bottle Fairy). She uses the name Kumoko when writing theme songs for the anime and manga series 'Rave Master'. She is also a member of duo Hitomi Sora for 'Wagaya no Oinari-sama.', opening song. Sora (Avatar name: Solary Clary) also got called to compose a three series of ballet music for the fifth production "Shuzenji" for the world first virtual ballet group Ballet Pixelle (formerly Second Life Ballet) created by the director and founder Inarra Saarinen in Second Life(R). Also the ex-CEO of Dog-Rights Co.,Ltd, by which publishing of free magazines called "Dog-Rights", to appeal better Japanese dogs' situations. Sora started a career as an Executive Producer by producing several music albums.

Discography

Singles 
 1998: Toushindai no Chikyugi
 1998: Yahoo!
 1998: Time Capsule
 1998: tu-la-la
 1999: Zutto Motto
 1999: Rocket de
 2000: Futsu Densha ni Notte
 2002: Higher and Higher for Rave(Rave Master) as Kumoko
 2003: Cibimimi (for Ponkickies21 as Chibi Mimi)
 2005: Scene Vol.1 CD and DVD
 2007: Ubugoe (as a member of Spiral Spiders)
 2008: Wagaya no Oinari-sama. (opening 'KI-ZU-NA' and c/w 'Kiseki' (lyrics/music-Sora Izumikawa)-singer as Hitomisora with Hitomi Yoshida)

Albums 
 1998: Sorae
 1999: Hajimaruyo-1 sainari
 2001: Ukare Beat Chika Ikkai
 2002: Hagane Machine
 2003: Tokyo Flamingo
 2003: TRIBUTE TO FLIPPER'S GUITAR FRIENDS AGAIN
 2004: DAUGHTER
 2006: Sora Best-incl. New single Ningyohime
 2007: 1981 PROJECT"THEME OF ROCKY"TOUR FINAL SHIBUYA AX (as a member of Spiral Spiders)
 2007: SHANGHAI SWING – 1950 SWING COVER JAZZ (Compilation Album – Shanghai/Get Out and Get Under the Moon)
 2008: aMERICAN SWING – Rock meets Jazz (sora&marhy=DAUGHTER feat. the fascinations)
 2009: 11 ("juuichi" as eleven in Japanese)- debut 11th anniversary, concept album
 2010: Smiles – concept album, for Label Dog-Rights, as Executive Producer, singer, composition, lyrics (arranger Masaki Narita)

Works for Others 
 Bottle Fairy  -Oshiete Sensei San (composition), Bottle Fairy (Nana Mizuki, Kaori Nazuka, Yui Horie, Ai Nonaka)
 Hitomi Mieno  -Yahoo!
 Mariko Koda  -Kokoro no Yajirushi, Sekaijuu no Post, Tomato  (lyrics・composition)  Ta・ra・ra"" (composition) etc.
 Megumi Hayashibara-Rumba Rumba  (lyrics・composition)  Kirameku Kakera (lyrics)
 Mayumi Iizuka -Itsumo no Kaerimichi, Soyokaze to café au lait, Duet de La La La, Drive Shiyou yo! (composition) in SMILE×SMILE, Mini Album 23degrees (composition), Akai kutsu no Cowboy in 10Love, Baby, dance with me♪ in  Crystal Days, Stories, Fight!! and Kimi e... etc.
 Yui Horie  -Happy happy * rice shower-type yui- (composition) etc.
 YeLLOW Generation  -Lost Generation (composition) etc.
 K Matsumura (Kunihiro Matsumura)  -Sorede Iinoda, Tomodachi to Shite (Producing for a project for Nippon Broadcasting System)
 Masaki Toriyama  -Kawaita Mune (composition) etc.
 Sanpei  -Sanpei no Everyday (composition)
 Miwako Okuda  -Utau Riyu, Nichiyoubi no Asa (composition)
 Yui Ichikawa  -Pure (lyrics・composition)
 Otoha-Hatsukoi  -Koi no Hane (lyrics) etc.
 Mayuko Omimura  -Shiawasena Takusan Juice no Shigeki (composition)
 Seiko Ishii  -Ima mo Itsumo (composition)
 Tomoe Shinohara  -Sutekina Nichiyoubi (lyrics・composition)
 KEN-JIN BAND  -Rocket (composition)
 Ballet Pixelle (formerly Second Life Ballet) -Shuzenji (Ballet music 3 Acts), Living Goddess (Ballet music 3 Acts)
 Emiri Kato  -Shiroi Kumo Oikakete (lyrics・composition),migite to hidarite (1st Single update) (lyrics・composition)
 Yoshimoto Gravure Agency (YGA)  -Chiisana Happy Agemasho (lyrics・composition)
 ROCO  -Sayonara Darling'' (lyrics)

TV 
 Songra Series (TV Tokyo)
 Ponkickies, Ponkickies21 (Fuji Television) CG Character voice as "Chibi Mimi"
 Tokyo Kids Club (Fuji Satellite Broadcasting) CG Character voice as "Chibi Mimi"

Radio 
 Izumikawa Sora no Doremifa Sorajio (RCC Broadcasting Company)
 Doremifa Sorando (FM Ehime)
 Izumikawa Sora no Ya-hoo! Station (FM Ehime)
 MIDNIGHT KISS Part2- Izumikawa Sora no Hochi-Kiss (Kiss-FM KOBE)

References and notes

External links 
 sorasora – Sora Izumikawa's solo website
 DAUGHTER – Official Website
 SPIRAL SPIDERS – Official Website
 Dog-Rights Co.,Ltd  – Official Website
 Dog-Rights Co.,Ltd  – Official Website (English)

Japanese women composers
Japanese women singer-songwriters
Japanese keyboardists
1971 births
Living people
People from Hiroshima
Musicians from Hiroshima Prefecture
20th-century Japanese women singers
20th-century Japanese singers
21st-century Japanese women singers
21st-century Japanese singers